Christian Nerlinger (born 21 March 1973) is a German former professional footballer who played as a central midfielder. His professional career was mainly associated with Bayern Munich and Borussia Dortmund.

Club career
Nerlinger was born in Dortmund. He signed for FC Bayern Munich at the age of 13, completing his formation at the Bavarian side. He was promoted to the first team in 1992, but made no Bundesliga appearances in his debut season.

In the following campaign, Nerlinger's impact, in a midfield which also comprised Jorginho, Lothar Matthäus, Mehmet Scholl and Christian Ziege, was immediate, and he helped the eventual champions by finishing as the second top scorer in the squad with nine goals – a career-best in the German top-flight – only behind Scholl and Adolfo Valencia's 11; he made his competition debut on 7 August 1993, in a 3–1 home win against SC Freiburg.

After another four solid seasons, Nerlinger moved to hometown club Borussia Dortmund, where he began suffering with injuries; this situation would be worsened in the following years, as he could hardly get a game at any of his following two clubs, Scotland's Rangers and 1. FC Kaiserslautern (he reunited with former Bayern teammate Carsten Jancker in the latter), forcing to his retirement from the game in December 2005.

International career
Nerlinger was capped six times by Germany, his debut coming on 5 September 1998, in a 1–1 friendly with Romania, in which he scored the equalizer five minutes from time. He did not attend, however, any major international tournament.

Managerial career
After his professional career ended, Nerlinger studied International Business at the Munich Business School. Shortly later he was appointed team manager at Bayern Munich. In January 2010, he succeeded Uli Hoeneß as technical manager, upgrading shortly after to general manager of the club. On 2 July 2012, Nerlinger was replaced by Matthias Sammer.

Nerlinger became Team Manager on 1 July 2008. He became Sporting Director of Bayern Munich on 1 July 2009. He held the position until June 2012 when he was replaced by Matthias Sammer.

Career statistics
Score and result list Germany's goal tally first, score column indicates score after Nerlinger goal.

Honours
Bayern Munich
 Bundesliga: 1993–94, 1996–97
 DFB-Pokal: 1997–98
 DFB Liga-Pokal: 1997
 UEFA Cup: 1995–96

Rangers
 Scottish Premier League: 2002–03
 Scottish Cup: 2001–02

References

External links

 
 
 
 

1973 births
Living people
German footballers
Association football midfielders
Germany international footballers
Germany under-21 international footballers
UEFA Cup winning players
Bundesliga players
FC Bayern Munich II players
FC Bayern Munich footballers
Borussia Dortmund players
1. FC Kaiserslautern players
Scottish Premier League players
Rangers F.C. players
FC Bayern Munich board members
German expatriate footballers
German expatriate sportspeople in Scotland
Expatriate footballers in Scotland
West German footballers